The 2022 Yaroslavl Oblast gubernatorial election took place on 9–11 September 2022, on common election day. Acting Governor Mikhail Yevrayev was elected to a full term.

Background
Deputy Minister of Internal Affairs Dmitry Mironov was appointed acting Governor of Yaroslavl Oblast in July 2016, replacing first term incumbent Sergey Yastrebov. Mironov won election for a full term as United Russia candidate in 2017 with 79.32% of the vote. Aleksey Dyumin became the first of "Putin's adjutants" – a group of Russian governors appointed in 2016–2018 who previously served in Federal Protective Service for President Putin, besides Dyumin, this group consists of former acting Kaliningrad Oblast Governor Yevgeny Zinichev (2016) and former acting Astrakhan Oblast Governor Sergey Morozov (2018–2019). In the 2021 Russian legislative election in Yaroslavl Oblast, United Russia suffered notable defeat, as it scored inly 29.72% of the vote (5th worst result nationally), while both single-mandate constituencies were won by SR-ZP candidates – Anatoly Greshnevikov and Anatoly Lisitsyn. On 12 October 2021, Assistant to the President Anatoly Seryshev was appointed Presidential Envoy to the Siberian Federal District, while Dmitry Mironov received Seryshev's position. The same day, former Deputy Head of the Federal Antimonopoly Service Mikhail Yevrayev was appointed acting Governor of Yaroslavl Oblast.

Due to the start of Russian special military operation in Ukraine in February 2022 and subsequent economic sanctions, the cancellation and postponement of direct gubernatorial elections was proposed. The measure was even supported by A Just Russia leader Sergey Mironov. Eventually, on 7 June, the Yaroslavl Oblast Duma called the gubernatorial election for 11 September 2022.

Candidates
Until 2022 only political parties can nominate candidates for gubernatorial election in Yaroslavl Oblast, however, in May 2022 Yaroslavl Oblast Duma passed a law, allowing self-nomination in the gubernatorial elections. Candidate for Governor of Yaroslavl Oblast should be a Russian citizen and at least 30 years old. Each candidate in order to be registered is required to collect at least 5% of signatures of members and heads of municipalities (52 signatures). Self-nominating candidates in addition should collect signatures of 9,980 registered voters. Also gubernatorial candidates present three candidacies to the Federation Council and election winner later appoints one of the presented candidates.

Registered
 Igor Miloradov (Communists of Russia), aide to Yaroslavl Oblast Duma member
 Mikhail Paramonov (CPRF), former Member of Yaroslavl Oblast Duma (2008–2013, 2016–2018), 2017 gubernatorial candidate
 Vladimir Smirnov (LDPR), Member of Yaroslavl Oblast Duma
 Konstantin Tukeyev (RPPSS), engineer
 Mikhail Yevrayev (Independent), acting Governor of Yaroslavl Oblast, former Deputy Head of Federal Antimonopoly Service (2018–2021)

Did not file
 Aleksey Antipov (Independent), auto repairer
 Sergey Balabayev (Yabloko), former Member of Yaroslavl Oblast Duma (2013–2018), 2017 PARNAS gubernatorial candidate

Declined
 Denis Dobryakov (United Russia), former Mayor of Rybinsk
 Anatoly Greshnevikov (SR-ZP), Member of State Duma
 Tina Kandelaki, journalist
 Anatoly Lisitsyn (SR-ZP), Member of State Duma, former Governor of Yaroslavl Oblast (1991–2007)
 Yevgeny Prilepin (SR-ZP), Co-chairman of A Just Russia — For Truth, writer, former Member of State Duma (2021)

Candidates for Federation Council
Incumbent Senator Sergey Beryozkin was not renominated.
Igor Miloradov (Communists of Russia):
Dmitry Garbul, self-employed, former Yaroslavl Oblast Duma staffer
Maria Lebedeva, dietician
Viktor Perunov, obstetrician
Mikhail Paramonov (CPRF):
Natalya Bobryakova, Member of Yaroslavl Municipal Council
Yelena Kuznetsova, Member of Yaroslavl Oblast Duma
Elkhan Mardaliyev, Member of Yaroslavl Oblast Duma
Vladimir Smirnov (LDPR):
Irina Lobanova, Member of Yaroslavl Oblast Duma
Marina Savelyeva, employment service specialist
Aleksandr Yerofeyev, engineer
Mikhail Yevrayev (Independent):
Nikolay Burlyayev (SR-ZP), Member of State Duma
Viktor Kostin, Chief Federal Inspector for Moscow, former First Deputy Chairman of the Government of Yaroslavl Oblast (2016–2018)
Aleksandr Rusakov, Rector of Yaroslavl State University

Results

|- style="background-color:#E9E9E9;text-align:center;"
! style="text-align:left;" colspan=2| Candidate
! style="text-align:left;"| Party
! width="75"|Votes
! width="30"|%
|-
| style="background-color:;"|
| style="text-align:left;"| Mikhail Yevrayev (incumbent)
| style="text-align:left;"| Independent
| 217,995
| 82.31
|-
| style="background-color:|
| style="text-align:left;"| Mikhail Paramonov
| style="text-align:left;"| Communist Party
| 16,263
| 6.14
|-
| style="background-color:;"|
| style="text-align:left;"| Vladimir Smirnov
| style="text-align:left;"| Liberal Democratic Party
| 11,055
| 4.17
|-
| style="background-color:|
| style="text-align:left;"| Igor Miloradov
| style="text-align:left;"| Communists of Russia
| 9,059
| 3.42
|-
| style="background-color:;"|
| style="text-align:left;"| Konstantin Tukeyev
| style="text-align:left;"| Party of Pensioners
| 5,538
| 2.09
|-
| style="text-align:left;" colspan="3"| Valid votes
| 259,910
| 98.13
|-
| style="text-align:left;" colspan="3"| Blank ballots
| 4,943
| 1.87
|- style="font-weight:bold"
| style="text-align:left;" colspan="3"| Total
| 264,854
| 100.00
|-
| style="background-color:#E9E9E9;" colspan="6"|
|-
| style="text-align:left;" colspan="3"| Turnout
| 264,854
| 26.65
|-
| style="text-align:left;" colspan="3"| Registered voters
| 993,990
| 100.00
|-
| colspan="5" style="background-color:#E9E9E9;"|
|- style="font-weight:bold"
| colspan="4" |Source:
|
|}

Yaroslavl State University Rector Aleksandr Rusakov (United Russia) was appointed to the Federation Council, replacing incumbent Senator Sergey Beryozkin (Independent).

See also
2022 Russian gubernatorial elections

References

Yaroslavl Oblast
Yaroslavl Oblast
Politics of Yaroslavl Oblast